Paul Curran is an Irish former Gaelic footballer who played for the Thomas Davis club and for the Dublin county team. He is currently the manager of Oliver Plunkett's and was previously with the Dublin Under-21 team as part of Jim Gavin's backroom team as well as manager of Ballymun Kickhams and Clann na nGael.

On 10 October 10, 2018, he was strongly linked with the Roscommon senior football job which was left vacant by Kevin McStay, who decided to walk away from a role he promised to do until 2020.

Sporting achievements
Curran was part of the Dublin team that beat Tyrone in the 1995 All-Ireland Senior Football Championship, he was also awarded the Texaco Footballer of the Year award in 1995 and was also the vice captain of the Dublin Senior football team. He played at right half back during the final. Curran also won the National Football League with Dublin in 1991 and 1993. He has also been an All-Star for Dublin on three occasions in 1992, 1995 and 1996. He has six Leinster Senior Football medals with Dublin in 1989, 1992, 1993, 1994, 1995 and 2002. Paul Curran is also an occasional panelist on RTÉ's The Sunday Game. He was also named on the annual Bluestars football team on six successive years in a variety of positions. Paul was on the Thomas Davis team that dominated the era of 1989 - 91 when they won three Dublin Senior Football Championships in-a-row.
He also played for Kilmaucd Crokes for 1 year after a row with Thomas Davis.

He won the 2012 Dublin senior football championship as manager of Ballymun Kickhams.

Football pedigree
Paul's father Noel Curran is also a winner of an All-Ireland medal; he was full forward on the Meath team which won the All Ireland in 1967. He knocked out 3 of Finbar Cullen's teeth in an off-the-ball incident in December 97. Cullen has stated he forgave Curran years ago in an interview with his club website.

Positions
Curran was a versatile player, he played at many positions for Dublin during his inter-county career. In his first senior football year of 1990, Curran played at midfield for Dublin, partnering his club-mate Dave Foran. In 1991 he was at centre half-back, and he changed again in 1992 when was picked right half-back. The changes continued in 1993 when he was selected at left half-back. Then in 1994 he played at centre half-forward while in 1995 he was named at midfield alongside Erins Isle's Keith Barr, although he played in the All-Ireland final for Dublin at right half back in the final.

References

Year of birth missing (living people)
Living people
Dublin inter-county Gaelic footballers
Gaelic football backs
Gaelic football managers
Gaelic games writers and broadcasters
Sportspeople from Dublin (city)
Thomas Davis Gaelic footballers
Texaco Footballers of the Year
Winners of one All-Ireland medal (Gaelic football)